This list of the largest cities on the United States West Coast includes the largest cities by population within the West Coast states of Alaska, Washington, Oregon, and California. Historically, the largest population hubs along the West Coast have been centered along the coastal regions and port cities such as Los Angeles, San Francisco, Seattle, Portland, San Diego, and Anchorage. The majority of the West Coast's largest cities are located within the state of California, with Los Angeles being the largest.

Cities

References

West Coast
West Coast